Billy Connolly's World Tour of England, Ireland and Wales is the third of Scottish comedian Billy Connolly's "world tours" commissioned by the BBC. It was first aired in 2002, and was released on DVD in 2004, with three episodes on disc one and the remaining five on disc two.

Episode guide

Episode 1: In the first episode, Connolly visits the city of Dublin, Ireland

Episode 2: Connolly visits the city of Belfast in Northern Ireland. While there, he visits a graveyard that has a wall built under the ground to keep the Protestants and Catholics apart in death.

Episode 3: While still in Ireland, Connolly visits the town of Killarney and surrounding areas.

Episode 4: Connolly's first episode to be set in England starts in the city of Newcastle upon Tyne. On his visit he gives an insight to how the Geordies got their nickname.

Episode 5: The fifth episode focuses on the nation's capital, London. Connolly climbs to the top of the Big Ben clock tower, rides down the River Thames, and performs at Shakespeare's Globe.

Episode 6: Connolly visits the cities of Manchester and Sheffield.

Episode 7: The whole episode focuses on the country of Wales, in which he visits Cardiff, the Brecon Beacons and Portmeirion.

Episode 8: In the final episode of the series, Connolly visits Bournemouth. In an almost traditional way for his World Tour Series, he strips down to nothing as he rides off on his bike during the ending credits.

Music
The closing credits of each episode feature Ralph McTell, Cara Dillon and Mary Hopkin singing verses of McTell's song, "England" (suitably adapted for 'Ireland' and 'Cymru').  Hopkin can additionally be heard singing a verse of "Bugeilio'r Gwenith Gwyn" during Episode 7. The DVD also includes audio tracks of songs performed by Connolly and Dillon, and instrumental versions of three McTell compositions (including the series' theme tune).

External links 
 

2002 British television series debuts
2002 British television series endings
Scottish television shows
BBC television documentaries
Comedy tours
Billy Connolly
English-language television shows